Robert Wolcott is the name of a fictional character in:
The Reclusive Potential
Zapped!